Turks in Kuwait are Kuwaiti people of Turkish ancestry and foreign Turkish people who live in Kuwait. By Turkish roots, this could mean roots linking back to Turkey, the island of Cyprus or the communities of the Turkish diaspora.

History

Business 
Turkish people work in barber shops, furniture shops, restaurants.
There are Turkish teachers, doctors, engineers and businessmen in Kuwait.

Notable Turks in Kuwait 
Dina Al-Sabah (mother is half-Syrian, half Turkish)

See also 
Kuwait–Turkey relations
Basra Province, Ottoman Empire

References

Bibliography 
.
.

Kuwait
Ethnic groups in Kuwait
Kuwait–Turkey relations